Josué Modesto dos Passos Subrinho  (born 22 January 1956 in Ribeirópolis, Sergipe) is a Brazilian professor of economics at the Federal University of Sergipe. He is currently Rector of the Universidade Federal da Integração Latino-Americana Brazil.

Biography
He graduated with a degree in Economics from the Federal University of Sergipe in (1977). He has a master's degree (1983) and  a PhD (1992) in Economics from the Universidade Estadual de Campinas UNICAMP.

He has taught at the Federal University of Sergipe, among other institutions.

References

Biography of the rector of the UFS
PAPO SÉRIO COM JOSUÉ MODESTO DOS PASSOS SUBRINHO – REITOR DA UNILA
La actividad docente: nuevas formas y nuevos alcances - Fase cerrada
Reunião com o Reitor Josué Modesto dos Passos Subrinho
ESTUDANTES LATINO-AMERICADOS DA UNILA QUEREM MAIS
Interview with the dean of Josué Modesto dos Passos Sobrinho infonet 20/02/2006 - 15:27,
Unila usará prédio da Uniamérica com exclusividade
O reitor da Universidade Federal da Integração Latino-Americana (Unila), Josué Modesto dos Passos Subrinho, estará na Unilab na próxima sexta-feira (08), às 15h, para conversar com professores e estudantes sobre a atuação da universidade
Passos Subrinho assume reitoria da Unila
Unila participa de implementação do Enlaces
Secretária parabeniza novo reitor da UFS
professor Josué Modesto dos Passos Subrinho ao cargo de reitor da Universidade Federal de Sergipe
Reitor da UFS constata bom andamento das obras no Campus da Saúde
UNILA terá oito novos laboratórios para atividades de ensino e pesquisa
Boletim Sergipe Econômico é oficializado
Universidade e desenvolvimento econômico local: o caso da UNILA
Convention de coopération entre l'Universidade Federal de Sergipe, Brésil, et l’Université du Québec à Montréal, Canada
Vestibulandos comemoram aprovação na UFS
Celso Amorim abre ano letivo na Unila

Brazilian economists
1956 births
Academic staff of the Federal University of Sergipe
Federal University of Sergipe alumni
People associated with the State University of Campinas
State University of Campinas alumni
Living people
Rectors of universities in Brazil